Protein-fructosamine 3-kinase (FN3K, fructosamine 3-kinase) is an enzyme with systematic name ATP:(protein)-N6-D-fructosyl-L-lysine 3-phosphotransferase. This enzyme catalyses the following chemical reaction

 ATP + [protein]-N6-D-fructosyl-L-lysine  ADP + [protein]-N6-(3-O-phospho-D-fructosyl)-L-lysine

Nonenzymatic glycation is a factor in the pathogenesis of diabetes.

References

External links 
 

EC 2.7.1